Grethe Rostbøll (30 May 1941 – 26 July 2021) was a Danish politician. She was a member of The Conservative People's Party (DKF) and also associated with the People's Movement against the EU.

Biography
Born in Aarhus, Rostbøll was the daughter of farmer Gustav Fogh and Ellen Marie Brandt. She served as Minister for Culture from 1990 to 1993 under the fourth government of Poul Schlüter. She also served in the Folketing in 1995 and again from 1996 to 1998. A candidate for the Folketing in 1990, she also ran for the European Parliament in 1979.

References

1941 births
2021 deaths
Danish politicians
20th-century Danish women politicians
People from Aarhus